Georgios Podaras (born 3 October 1972) is a retired Greek football midfielder.

References

1972 births
Living people
Greek footballers
Panelefsiniakos F.C. players
Panathinaikos F.C. players
Apollon Smyrnis F.C. players
Ethnikos Asteras F.C. players
Kassandra F.C. players
Vyzas F.C. players
Super League Greece players
Association football midfielders
People from Euboea (regional unit)
Footballers from Central Greece